Aristotelia euprepella is a moth of the family Gelechiidae. It was described by Zerny in 1934. It is found in Lebanon and Turkey.

References

Moths described in 1934
Aristotelia (moth)
Moths of the Middle East
Moths of Asia